Richard Sinclair Brodie (9 September 1813 – 18 January 1872) was a Scottish-born Australian cricketer who played for Victoria. He was born in Caithness and died in Bulla, Victoria.

Brodie made a single first-class appearance for the side, during the 1853–54 season, against Tasmania. From the lower order, he scored six runs in the first innings in which he batted, and a single run in the second.

References

External links
Richard Brodie at Cricket Archive

1813 births
1872 deaths
Australian cricketers
Victoria cricketers
Melbourne Cricket Club cricketers
Scottish emigrants to Australia
People from Caithness